Cory Charles Lerios (born February 12, 1951) is an American pianist and vocalist. He is a founding member of the platinum-record-selling soft rock band Pablo Cruise, and since the mid-1980s he has scored music for film and television.

History
Lerios was born, in Palo Alto, California, and entered the music industry in 1971 with the San Francisco Bay area band Stoneground. At the time, Stoneground was signed with Warner Bros., and Lerios was 20 years old. After leaving the band in 1973, Lerios, along with fellow Stoneground members Steve Price and David Jenkins, formed Pablo Cruise. In 1975, they released their first album, self-titled Pablo Cruise, for A&M Records. The band completed several national tours, released seven albums, and sold millions of records before disbanding in 1986.

Having been one of the primary songwriters for Pablo Cruise, ("Love Will Find a Way", "Whatcha Gonna Do?"), Lerios tried composing for film and television. His first major production was One Crazy Summer, a 1986 comedy. Later, Lerios partnered with John D'Andrea to start a music production studio called Lerios D'Andrea Music Works, based in Los Angeles. Together they wrote and produced a number of themes, songs and dramatic and comedic scores for TV shows including Baywatch (300 episodes), Days of Our Lives, Diagnosis: Murder, Max Headroom and The Land Before Time).

In 2012 Lerios produced a live DVD and CD for Pablo Cruise entitled It's Good To Be Live!, released through Sony Entertainment. Pablo Cruise released another live CD through Sony Entertainment in 2013. As of August 2014, Lerios was scoring and producing the music for the international TV series SAF3 and touring with the original members of Pablo Cruise. In 2015 Lerios released an EP, If I Could Change Anything It Would Be You!, under the name Cory Charles.

Credits

Television
2014/15 SAF3 (TV series) Episodes, Music Supervision
2013/14  SAF3 (TV series) Episodes
2013 "Men At Work"
2013 Ernst & Young Entrepreneur Awards Programme
2013 "Bench" International Promos
2011 Yu-Gi-Oh! Main Title Theme & Episodes
2010 Ernst & Young Entrepreneur Awards Programme
2009 Hope For Children, Documentary
2009 Terrell Lloyd, Documentary
2009 Geortrax Animated Series Theme/Pilot
2009 Ernst & Young Entrepreneur of the Year Awards Theme  
2008 The Land Before Time 
2006 Choose Your Own Adventure: The Abominable Snowman
2004/5 ToddWorld
2004 The Best TV Shows That Never Were 
2004 Hot Wheels AcceleRacers
2004 E! Diary of An Affair 
2003 Baywatch: "Hawaiian Wedding" 
2001 The Mummy
2000 Murder in the Mirror
2000/2001 Intimate Portrait (TV series)
1999 The Test of Love (movie)
1999 Diagnosis: Murder (series)
1999 A Secret Life (movie)
1998 A Marriage of Convenience  (movie)
1998 Martial Law (TV series)
1998 Baywatch: "White Thunder at Glacier Bay"  (movie)
1997 Baywatch: "Assault on Devil's Island"  (movie)
1997 Steel Chariots
1997 In the Line of Duty: Blaze of Glory (movie)
1996 Gone in a Heartbeat (movie)
1996 Fall Into Darkness (movie)
1996 Angel Flight Down 
1995/96 Flipper  (series)
1995/96 Baywatch Nights (series)
1995 Baywatch: Forbidden Paradise  (movie)
1993/94 Mighty Max (TV series)
1993/94/95 Days of Our Lives  (daytime soap opera)
1994 Deadly Vows (movie)
1990 E.A.R.T.H. Force (series)
1989/2001 Baywatch. All 11 seasons (theme & 300 episodes)
1987 Max Headroom
Hard Copy

Film
Street Fighter II: The Animated Movie (1994)
Thunder in Paradise (1993) (V)
The Tower (1993) (TV)
Boiling Point (1993/I)
Beyond the Law (1992)
The Entertainers (1991) (TV)
Child's Play 3 (1991)
Night Angel (1990)
Police Story: Burnout (1988) (TV)
One Crazy Summer (1986)
Dracula A.D. 1972 (1972) (as a member of Stoneground)

Themes
CBS LOGO: theme: CBS
CBS PRODUCTIONS LOGO: theme: CBS
STARZ LOGO: theme: STARZ
DIRECT T.V.: DIRECT T.V.
TNT SUNDAY CLASSICS MOVIE: theme: Turner Broadcasting
TNT (TV channel)|TNT FEATURE FILMS: series & theme: Turner Broadcasting
RAVE: Arts & Entertainment
CBS TUESDAY NIGHT MOVIES: theme: CBS
CBS SUNDAY NIGHT MOVIES: theme: CBS
A & E MYSTERY MOVIES: A&E NETWORK
16th ANNUAL CABLE ACE AWARDS: TNT: Producer: David Lawrence
San Disk LOGO:Theme: Commercial

Discography

Pablo Cruise

Singles

Additional discography (writer or performer)
Stoneground 3, Stoneground - Warner Bros. Records
Last days of the Filmore, Various Artists w/ Stoneground - Fillmore Records
Nadia's Themes, Various Artists - A&M Records
George Benson, "Teaser" - Warner Bros. Records
The Neville Brothers, "Forever Tonight"
Melba Moore and Ben E. King, "A Test Of Time"
Santana, "She Can’t Let It Go"
Christina Milian, "Call Me, Beep Me"
Smokey Robinson, "It's a Colorful World"
Plan 9, "Whatcha Gonna Do?"

Keyboardist or programmer
Geoff Byrd
Whitney Houston
Kenny G
Santana
The Neville Brothers
Narada Michael Walden
Smokey Robinson

Awards and nominations
Daytime Emmy awards:
Won, 1997, Outstanding Music Direction and Composition for a Drama Series for: "Days of Our Lives" (shared with Ken Corday, Brent Nelson, Dominic Messinger, John D'Andrea, Amy Burkhard Evans, and Stephen Reinhardt)
 Emmy Nomination, Days of Our Lives ’94 ‘95
 Emmy Nomination, Days of Our Lives ’93 ‘94
 Emmy Honors, Jay Meisel Documentary

ASCAP awards:
Won, 1996, Top TV Series for "Baywatch"
Won, 1997, Top TV Series for "Baywatch"
Won, 1997, Most Performed Underscore

BMI awards
BMI Most Performed Song, Whatcha Gonna Do? Pablo Cruise
BMI Most Performed Song, Love Will Find a Way Pablo Cruise
BMI Most Performed Song, Cool Love Pablo Cruise
BMI Most Performed Song, Don’t Want to Live Without It Pablo Cruise

TELLY AWARD:  "Hope For Children"

References

External sources

 Cory Lerios Official Website
 Pablo Cruise Official Website
 

American film score composers
Musicians from Palo Alto, California
1951 births
Living people
American rock keyboardists
American male singers
American session musicians
American pop pianists
American rock pianists
American male pianists
American pop rock singers
Songwriters from California
20th-century American pianists
Pablo Cruise members
21st-century American pianists
American male film score composers
20th-century American male musicians
21st-century American male musicians
21st-century American keyboardists
American male songwriters